Piercing most commonly refers to body piercing.

It may also refer to:

Piercing (metalworking), a manufacturing process for cutting webs, sheet metal, and plates
Piercing (novel)
Piercing (film), a 2018 horror film
Rotary piercing, a metalworking process for forming seamless tubes
"Piercing", a 2001 song by Katy Hudson (later known as Katy Perry) from the album Katy Hudson